Deh Asiab (also Romanized as Deh Āsīāb; also known as Deh Āsīāb-e Dīnvar) is a village in Dinavar Rural District, Dinavar District, Sahneh County, Kermanshah Province, Iran. At the 2006 census, its population was 107, in 29 families.

References 

Populated places in Sahneh County